The Texas State Open is the Texas state open golf tournament, open to both amateur and professional golfers. It is organized by the Northern Texas section of the PGA of America. It was first played in 1960 and has been played annually since 1975 at a variety of courses around the state.

Winners

References

External links
PGA of America - Northern Texas section
Tournament history
List of winners

Golf in Texas
PGA of America sectional tournaments
State Open golf tournaments